Arrupe Jesuit High School is a private, Roman Catholic coeducational college-preparatory high school run by the USA Central and Southern Province of the Society of Jesus in Denver, Colorado, United States. Founded in 2003, it is part of the Cristo Rey Network and places students in business internships to help defray the cost of tuition. The school is run independently in the Roman Catholic Archdiocese of Denver.

History
Arrupe Jesuit High School was founded by the Missouri Province (renamed USA Central and Southern Province) of the Jesuits and business leaders in Denver as a school using the Cristo Rey model to serve economically disadvantaged students. The school was named after the former superior general of the Jesuit order, Father Pedro Arrupe.

In early 2003, the school purchased the Holy Family Catholic School campus in northwest Denver to house the new program.

The school opened in August 2003 with a class of ninth graders and added another grade each year until the 2006-2007 school year, which saw the school's first graduating class of 47 students. In 2017 it had a 10-year record of graduating all its students and having all of them accepted into college.

Only 36% of Hispanics and 55% of African-Americans graduate from high school in Denver. To expand its enrollment, Arrupe Jesuit High completed an $11-million building program in 2015, which added seven classrooms with advanced technology, student fitness and activities rooms, a new cafeteria, and additional office space. A new chapel was built in the former building, along with three new classrooms and office and work space.

Arrupe was chosen as a successful school by the Bill & Melinda Gates Foundation. The Gates Foundation has also given $18.9 million in support of Cristo Rey schools across the country. Each year some graduates of Jesuit schools who have finished college volunteer to assist at Arrupe, through the Alum Service Corps program.

Curriculum
Arrupe requires students to earn about two-thirds of the annual cost of their education through a corporate work-study program where students job-share entry-level positions, working five days a month from mid-August to early June. Students have 6 academic classes per day, and if they fail to do their homework they have mandatory study hall (7th Period).

Extracurricular activities
Athletic teams at Arrupe compete at the 3A level in Colorado High School Activities Association-sanctioned competition. Teams are fielded in men's soccer, women's volleyball, men's and women's basketball, women's soccer, baseball, and cross-country.

References

External links
 

Catholic secondary schools in Colorado
Educational institutions established in 2003
High schools in Denver
Poverty-related organizations
Jesuit high schools in the United States
Cristo Rey Network
Roman Catholic Archdiocese of Denver
2003 establishments in Colorado